The ARIA Music Award for Best Jazz Album is an award presented within the Fine Arts Awards at the annual ARIA Music Awards.

The award for Best Jazz Album was first presented in 1987, when George Golla Orchestra, received a trophy for their album, Lush Life (1987). Paul Grabowsky has won the award seven times in various guises (leader of the Paul Grabowsky Trio, Paul Grabowsky Sextet, duet with Vince Jones, duet with Katie Noonan, duet with Kate Ceberano and as a member of Wizards Of Oz).


Winners and nominees
In the following table, the winner is highlighted in a separate colour, and in boldface; the nominees are those that are not highlighted or in boldface.

References

External links

 

 
Jazz
Jazz awards